Each year since 2018, the Network Science Society (NetSci Society) selects up to 7 members of the network science community to be Fellows based on their enduring contributions to network science research and to the community of network scientists. Fellows are chosen from nominations received by the Network Science Society Fellowship Committee and are announced at the NetSci Conference hosted every year.

2022 Fellows of the Network Science Society 

 Fan Chung
 Vittoria Colizza
 Noshir Contractor
 Santo Fortunato
 Byungnam Kahng
 Yamir Moreno
 Olaf Sporns

2021 Fellows of the Network Science Society 

 Lada Adamic
 Albert-László Barabási
 Peter Sheridan Dodds
 Jürgen Kurths
 Vito Latora
 Marta Sales-Pardo

2020 Fellows of the Network Science Society 

 Alex Arenas
 Alain Barrat
 Ginestra Bianconi
 Jennifer A. Dunne
 Michelle Girvan
 Adilson E. Motter
 Brian Uzzi

2019 Fellows of the Network Science Society 
The 2019 Fellows of the Network Science Society were honored at the 2019 NetSci Conference in Vermont, USA.

 Guido Caldarelli
 Raissa M. D'Souza
 Stuart A. Kauffman
 Jon M. Kleinberg
 José Fernando F. Mendes
 Anna Nagurney
 Luís A. Nunes Amaral

2018 Fellows of the Network Science Society 
The 2018 Fellows of the Network Science Society were honored at the 2018 NetSci Conference in Paris, France.

 Réka Albert
 Mark Granovetter
 Yoshiki Kuramoto
 Mark E. J. Newman
 Steven H. Strogatz
 Alessandro Vespignani
 Duncan J. Watts

References

External links 

 Network Science Society

Science and technology award winners